Paracanthella pavonina is a species of tephritid or fruit flies in the genus Paracanthella of the family Tephritidae.

Distribution
Bulgaria & Russia (West Siberia) to Central Asia.

References

Tephritinae
Insects described in 1875
Taxa named by Josef Aloizievitsch Portschinsky
Diptera of Asia
Diptera of Europe